Locharbriggs is a village in Dumfries and Galloway, Scotland. It was one of several villages that stood on the edge of the Lochar Moss which was largely reclaimed in the 19th Century.

Locharbriggs is known for the quarrying of distinctive red sandstone of the Locharbriggs Sandstone Formation. This has been used for buildings in towns and cities including Dumfries, Glasgow and Edinburgh. The stone has also been exported further afield, including for the construction of the steps of the Statue of Liberty in New York. Only one quarry now remains active.

The village's amenities include bus services, three local shops, a public house (the Lochar Inn), a social club, a Chinese takeaway, fish and chip shop, hairdressers, community centre, a library, and a primary school.

Transport links from Locharbriggs to Dumfries often suffer during school holidays, when major works are routinely carried out on the main A701 trunk road.

References

External links

Villages in Dumfries and Galloway
Dumfries